In Norse mythology, Reginn (Old Norse: ᚱᛁᚼᛁᚾ/ᚱᛁᚽᛁᚿ ; often anglicized as Regin or Regan) is a son of Hreiðmarr and the foster father of Sigurd. His brothers are Fafnir and Ótr.

Regin in the sagas 
When Loki mistakenly kills Ótr, Hreiðmarr demands to be repaid with the amount of gold it takes to fill Ótr's skin and cover the outside. Loki takes this gold from the dwarf Andvari, who curses it and especially the ring Andvaranaut. Fafnir kills his father for this gold, but eventually becomes a greedy dragon. Reginn gets none of the gold, but he becomes smith to the king and foster father to Sigurd, teaching him many languages as well as sports, chess, and runes.

Reginn had all wisdom and deftness of hand. Of his two brothers, he has the ability to work iron as well as silver and gold and he makes many beautiful and useful things. While Sigurd is living with Reginn, Reginn challenges Sigurd's respect in the kingdom. He tells Sigurd to ask for a horse. Sigurd asks the advice of an old man in the forest, and the old man shows him how to get a horse that is descended from Sleipnir, the eight-legged horse of Odin. Reginn continues to goad Sigurd, this time into killing Reginn's brother Fafnir. He offers to make a sword for Sigurd, but Sigurd broke every sword Reginn forged for him by striking at an anvil. Sigurd retrieves the broken pieces of his father Sigmund's sword, Gram, and brings them to Reginn. Reginn repairs the sword and gives it back to Sigurd. When Sigurd again tests the blade by striking the anvil, the anvil this time is split down to its base, and when Sigurd places a piece of wool in a stream, the current pushing the wool against the sword was enough to cause the blade to cut it in two. Sigurd is finally very pleased with Reginn's repaired weapon.

After using Gram to kill Fafnir, Sigurd returns to ask Reginn what to do. Reginn instructs him to roast the heart of Fafnir, his brother, and let him eat it. As juice from the dragon's heart foams out, Sigurd tests it with his finger to see if it is done cooking. As the blood touches his tongue, Sigurd understands the speech of birds, who warn him that Reginn intends to kill him. Before he lets any of this happen, Sigurd first wields Gram and cuts off Reginn's head.

The Norwegian Thidrekssaga relates a slightly different tale, with Reginn as the dragon and Mimir as his brother and foster father to Sigurd.

Reginn the Dvergr 
In the 13th century's Poetic Edda (Völuspá 12), the Dvergatal lists Reginn as a Dvergr (Norse dwarf).

Among the heroic lays of the Poetic Edda (Reginsmál, aka Sigurðarkviða Fáfnisbana Önnur) says:
Reginn the son of Hreiðmarr .. was the most skillful of men, and a Dvergr of size. He was wise, dark, and versed in magic.
Reginn .. var hverjum manni hagari ok dvergr of vöxt. Hann var vitr, grimmr, ok fjölkunnigr.

The Prose Edda (Skáldskaparmál 46) identifies the father of Reginn as Hreiðmarr, and his brothers Fáfnir and Ótr.

Modern influence 

In the operatic cycle Der Ring des Nibelungen by Richard Wagner, the role of Reginn is played by the Nibelung dwarf Mime, brother of Alberich (the Nibelung who forged the cursed ring out of the Rhinegold). Except for the change in name, probably inspired by the Thidrekssaga, the story of Reginn, Sigurd, and Fafner in Siegfried follows closely the text of the Eddas. However, in this version Mime is unable to reforge the sword Nothung, since only one who does not know fear—such as Siegfried—can do so.

Reginn also appears as the main protagonist of Book V in Fire Emblem Heroes, albeit as a female dwarf as opposed to being male. She is voiced by Megan Shipman.

Notes

References 
 .

Elves
Fictional murdered people
Nibelung tradition
Norse dwarves
Völsung cycle